A World for Julius (Spanish: Un mundo para Julius) is a 2021 internationally co-produced drama film written and directed by Rossana Díaz Costa. The film is based on the homonymous book by the writer Alfredo Bryce Echenique.

Synopsis 
Julius, a aristocrat boy, lives in the family mansion alongside extensive servants in the capital Lima of the late 1950s. As he grows up and loses his innocence, and with it understanding the inequalities and injustices of the adult world.

Cast 
The actors participating in this film are:

 Rodrigo Barba as Julius -minor-
 Augusto Linares as Julius -older-
 Fiorella de Ferrari as Susan
 Mayella Loclla as Vilma
 Nacho Fresnada as Juan Lucas
 Camila Mac Lennan as Susana Lastarria
 Liliana Alegría as Nilda
 Fernando Bacilio as Celso
 Hermelinda Luján as Bertha
 Antonieta Pari as Armanda
 Gonzalo Torres as Juan Lastarria
 Xavier Sardà as Father Javier

Production 
Filming, entirely in Lima, began in October 2019, lasting 5 weeks.

Release 
The film had a planned television release in 2020, but it was canceled due to the Covid-19 pandemic. The film premiered on October 15, 2021 at the San Diego International Film Festival. It was finally released commercially on November 11, 2021.

Reception 
The film drew more than 11,500 viewers in its opening weekend in theaters. By its fifth week, the film drew more than 40,000 viewers.

Awards

References

External links 

 

2021 films
2021 drama films
Peruvian drama films
Argentine drama films
Spanish drama films
2020s Spanish-language films
2020s Peruvian films
2020s Argentine films
2020s Spanish films
Films set in Peru
Films shot in Peru
Films set in the 1950s
Films about poverty
Films about social class
Films about children
Films about families
Films based on novels
Films impacted by the COVID-19 pandemic